This article presents a list of the historical events and publications of Australian literature during 1890.

Books 

 Ada Cambridge – Not All in Vain : A Novel
 Carlton Dawe – The Golden Lake
 E. W. Hornung – A Bride from the Bush
 Fergus Hume
 The Gentleman Who Vanished: A Psychological Phantasy
 Miss Mephistopheles
 Alick Macleod – An Australian Girl
 Hume Nisbet
 Ashes: A Tale of Two Spheres
 Bail Up!: A Romance of Bushrangers and Blacks

Short stories 

 Marcus Clarke
 Australian Tales
 Humour in Verse and Prose
 Sensational Stories
 Edward Dyson – "A Golden Shanty"
 Ernest Favenc
 "A Haunt of the Jinkarras: A Fearsome Story of Central Australia"
 "Spirit-Led"
 Henry Lawson – "The Third Murder: A New South Wales Tale"
 Price Warung
 "How Muster-Master Stoneman Earned His Breakfast"
 "Lieutenant Darrell's Predicament"
 "Under the Whip, or, The Parson's Lost Soul"

Children's and Young Adult 

 Ernest Favenc – The Secret of the Australian Desert

Poetry 

 Barcroft Boake – "Jack's Last Muster"
 Victor J. Daley – "Even So" 
 Edward Dyson – "The Trucker"
 Henry Halloran – A Few Love Rhymes of a Married Life
 Henry Lawson
 "Middleton's Rouseabout"
 "The Song of Old Joe Swallow"
 " A Word to Texas Jack"
 A. B. Paterson
 "Conroy's Gap"
 "The Man from Snowy River"
 "On Kiley's Run"

Essays 

 Louisa Lawson – "That Nonsensical Idea"

Births 

A list, ordered by date of birth (and, if the date is either unspecified or repeated, ordered alphabetically by surname) of births in 1890 of Australian literary figures, authors of written works or literature-related individuals follows, including year of death.

 28 March – Alec Chisholm, encyclopaedist (died 1977) 
 18 May – Zora Cross, poet (died 1964)
 1 September – Arthur W. Upfield, novelist (died 1964)
 19 October – Nina Murdoch, poet (died 1976)
 13 December – Dulcie Deamer, poet (died 1972)

Deaths 

A list, ordered by date of death (and, if the date is either unspecified or repeated, ordered alphabetically by surname) of deaths in 1890 of Australian literary figures, authors of written works or literature-related individuals follows, including year of birth.

See also 
 1890 in poetry
 List of years in literature
 List of years in Australian literature
 1890 in literature
 1889 in Australian literature
 1890 in Australia
 1891 in Australian literature

References

Literature
Australian literature by year
19th-century Australian literature
1890 in literature